The Owen Sound Transportation Company, Limited was the forerunner of the enterprise that currently operates the vehicle and passenger ferry - M.S. Chi-Cheemaun - between Tobermory on the Bruce Peninsula, and South Baymouth on Manitoulin Island.  For updated information, see the article on the M.S. Chi-Cheemaun.

The Owen Sound Transportation Company was established by businessmen in the Owen Sound area, in 1921. These included W. G. Hay, president; J. H. Hay, vice president; and J. Garvey, secretary-treasurer. These three men were also associated with the Owen Sound-based North American Bent Chair Company. Their objective was to use the company's steamboat, S.S. Michipicoten, in freight-only service from Owen Sound to isolated communities along the north shore of Lake Huron and Manitoulin Island.

It is likely the intended purpose of the navigation company was to procure the materials necessary for the manufacture of the North American Bent Chair Company's Bentwood furniture, as well as the transportation of packaged freight from Owen Sound. It was the objective of the officers of the firm to carry on the business of the furniture manufacturer as a subsidiary of Owen Sound Transportation Company (OSTC).

Owen Sound Transportation Company Limited 
Early in 1921, a rumor circulated through Owen Sound—a new steamboat line was being formed to re-establish cruises to the popular tourist destination of Mackinac Island. Promoted by a Collingwood steamship line, from the late nineteenth century until about 1903 these steamboat excursions crossing Lake Huron were popular from the Georgian Bay area. But it was not until the spring of 1926 that Captain Norman McKay arranged a public meeting through the Owen Sound Board of Trade to raise funds for the purchase of a steamship and refit it for reopening direct traffic between Owen Sound and other points on the Mackinac route. In 1926 the Owen Sound Transportation Company Limited was granted supplementary letters patent, under the Ontario Companies Act, increasing its authorized capital stock from $40,000 to $150,000.

In 1926 the OSTC purchased the steel-hulled, screw steamer S.S. Modjeska, a former Lake Ontario excursion boat, intended as a day cruiser. The ship had been laid up since 1924, following a serious collision in Toronto Harbour. Repaired and outfitted for service, the Modjeska arrived at Owen Sound late in the season, but with time enough to operate a few excursions, as well as two round trips to Sault Ste Marie. Over the following winter, the ship was equipped with cabins and staterooms to accommodate up to 150 passengers. Renamed S.S. Manitoulin, she began her first full season June 6, 1927, with Norman McKay serving as captain.

Norman McKay of Owen Sound was not working on the Great Lakes at the time the company was first incorporated in 1921, in 1918 he had accepted an appointment as captain of the SS Canora, which he delivered from Davie Shipbuilding in Quebec to British Columbia and operated it between Vancouver and Vancouver Island for its first few years before returning to Owen Sound.

Cruising the North Channel
The weekly schedule of the S.S. Manitoulin began with an 11:15 p.m. Monday departure from Owen Sound, arriving Tuesday morning at Killarney, then through the North Channel, calling at Manitowaning, Little Current, Gore Bay, Meldrum Bay, Cockburn Island, Hilton Beach, Richards Landing, and Sault Ste. Marie, Ontario, arriving at Mackinac Island, on Wednesday evening. Returning over the same route with departure from Mackinac Island at 11 a.m. Thursday, the Manitoulin arrived at Owen Sound on Saturday morning at 4:30. Weekend trips on the Manitoulin departed 11:15 p.m. Saturday, with calls at Killarney, Manitowaning and Little Current, followed by arrival back in Owen Sound at 4:30 Monday morning.

The S.S. Michipicoten continued on an unscheduled freight-only service between Owen Sound and  Sault Ste. Marie, calling at Manitoulin Island and North Shore ports.  The Michipicoten was destroyed by fire at the Cooks Dock, near Silverwater on Manitoulin Island, on October 11, 1927.

To replace the Michipicoten, the OSTC purchased the S.S. Macassa, then under the ownership of the Canada Steamship Lines subsidiary Richelieu and Ontario Navigation Company. The Macassa had completed her season on September 30, 1927, operating as a day excursion steamer between Toronto and Hamilton. The Macassa was originally part of the Toronto and Hamilton Steamboat Company, along with her sister ship, the S.S. Modjeska. Over the following winter in Toronto, she was converted for the accommodation of overnight passengers. Renamed S.S. Manasoo, she departed from Toronto for Owen Sound on April 16, 1928.

The 1928 OSTC schedule for the S.S. Manitoulin continued as it had the previous year, while the Manisoo departed Owen Sound on Thursdays at 11:15 p.m. for a run that did not include Mackinac Island. After completing her northward voyage at Sault Ste Marie, the Manisoo returned to Owen Sound at 4:30 Tuesday mornings.

On September 15, 1928, the Manasoo foundered near Griffith Island in Georgian Bay. While fighting a heavy storm, she capsized when her cargo of 116 cattle apparently shifted to one side, overbalancing her. The recent addition of increased passenger accommodations on her upper deck is also thought to have contributed to her instability. She sank quickly. The bodies of her cattle are said to have stocked many a winter larder along the shores that year. All five of the survivors drifted for 60 hours in a life raft before being picked up by the CPR's S.S. Manitoba. A classic car was discovered inside the submerged shipwreck in November 2018.

Ferry service to Manitoulin Island

From the commencement of their operations, the S.S. Manitoulin (in 1927) and the S.S. Manasoo (in 1928) were capable of transporting automobiles. A competitor to the Owen Sound Transportation Company, the Dominion Transportation Company, also operated a pair of passenger and package freight vessels out of Owen Sound, over much the same route as the OSTC. In 1927 an automobile ferry, the S.S. Winona, provided service from Cutler to Gore Bay. Another automobile ferry serving Manitoulin Island was John Tackaberry's M.S. Alice, which sailed on a return route from Owen Sound, via Wiarton, Lion's Head,  Tobermory to South Baymouth, and Providence Bay.

Throughout the 1927 season, Tackaberry operated the M.S. Alice on the run to Providence Bay. He was, however, unsatisfied with the performance of the ship. Anxious to dispose of her, Tackaberry sold the Alice to the Booth Fisheries Corporation of Canada Ltd. on April 3, 1928. Renamed M.S. Hibou to bring her in line with the other ships of the Dominion fleet (S.S. Caribou and S.S. Manitou -- "Hibou" being the French word for "owl"), she was operated for Booth by a subsidiary company, the Dominion Transportation Company Limited (DTC). She served Dominion's routes from Owen Sound to Manitoulin Island and the ports of Lake Huron's North Channel.

Tobermory–South Baymouth ferry service

In 1930, Captain R. Vittie and H.W. Harmer, of Southampton, Ontario, obtained a charter for the Georgian Bay and Manitoulin Transportation Company. They had purchased John Tackaberry's S.S. Henry Pedwell. The steamer was taken to Midland where it was widened and its gangway modified to accommodate automobiles. Later that summer the Henry Pedwell was placed in ferry service between Tobermory and South Baymouth.

With the 1930 season underway, OSTC purchased a retired Detroit Fire Department fire boat named the S.S. James R Elliot, delivering it to the Midland Shipbuilding Company for conversion into a combination package freighter and passenger ferry. Replacing her boiler and steam engine with a new diesel engine increased her freight capacity and enabled her to transport automobiles. Overnight passenger cabins were also added. In 1931 the vessel was renamed the M.S. Normac, after the OSTC's general manager Norman McKay, captain of the S.S. Manitoulin.

The M.S. Normac began her scheduled route on July 16, 1931, taking the place formerly assigned to the S.S. Manasoo, leaving Owen Sound at 11:15 p.m. Thursdays and returning at 4:30 am on the following Tuesday. Meanwhile, with the S.S. Manitoulin continuing her weekly Monday evening departures from Owen Sound, the OSTC also acquired the service of the Georgian Bay and Manitoulin Transportation Company and its steamer the S.S. Henry Pedwell, which they renamed S.S. Kagawong. The Kagawong was returned to the Tobermory - South Baymouth auto ferry route during the 1931 July to September season. During early and late seasons she operated on the Sault Ste. Marie route from Tuesday evening to Saturday morning, with weekend trips to Providence Bay.

From 1932 the summer-only ferry service between Tobermory and South Baymouth was assigned to the M.S. Normac, which sailed the route sturdily and steadfastly for the next 30 seasons. The owners of the S.S. Kagawong, Vittie and Harmer, defaulted on the mortgage held on the ship by its previous owner, and it was relinquished back to John Tackaberry. Dominion Transportation Company operated its M.S. Hibou between Owen Sound and Providence Bay until 1933, when it was assigned to other duties. John Tackaberry operated his S.S. Islet Prince over the same route, although this ship was better known as a Pelee Island ferry.

In 1936 the Owen Sound Transportation Company Limited and its competitor, the Owen Sound-based Dominion Transportation Company Limited, managed by R. V. Malloy, decided to merge their operations. Together the two companies, under the joint management of McKay and Malloy, operated a pool passenger-freight service to Georgian Bay and North Channel ports and continuing through the Soo Locks and into Lake Superior to Michipicoten, as well as the auto ferry service between Tobermory and South Baymouth.

The M.S. Hibou did not run much during the early spring of 1936; in June she was placed on the Tobermory ferry service. The previous year the Hibou had operated as a ferry and excursion boat out of Kingston where most of its staterooms on the promenade deck had been removed to make room for sightseers and dancing. With the loss of her cabins, the Hibou was best suited for day use such as the ferry route it shared with the M.S. Normac.

On November 16, 1936, the Hibou made her last run on the ferry crossing and returned to Owen Sound, from where it was to take a few more trips to Killarney and Manitoulin Island. It was dangerously late in the navigation season and the only ships of the pool service still in operation were the Hibou and Normac, S.S. Manitou, S.S. Caribou and S.S. Manitoulin having already gone into winter quarters at Owen Sound. Captain Norman McKay took command of the Hibou while her regular captain, James Agnew, moved back to the position of first officer.

On its second trip to Killarney on Saturday, November 21, the cargo on board Hibou shifted while she was operating in relatively calm waters, causing her to founder and sink only 10 minutes out of Owen Sound. It is thought that while testing the accuracy of a new compass, Captain McKay had made a sharp turn to the port side, causing the cargo to shift to starboard. The ship listed to starboard, and did not recover. In the ensuing tragedy, not only the Hibou, but seven of the 17-member crew, and Captain McKay himself, were lost.

New management

The pool agreement between the two navigation companies continued through the 1930s and into the 1940s. The S.S. Manitou served on the Tobermory ferry route from 1937 until 1941 when it was retired, being replaced by Dominion Transportation Company's S.S. Caribou. The S.S. Manitoulin carried on its regular scheduled route from Owen Sound along the "Turkey Trail" of the North Channel; but instead of terminating at Mackinac Island, she continued through the Soo Locks and proceeded to Gargatua Harbour, and Michipicoten.

The 1936 pool arrangement between the two companies had been suggested by Ivor Wagner, a director of Booth Fisheries Corporation in Chicago. Wagner purchased the Dominion Transportation Company Limited in 1937 and moved to Owen Sound the following year. In 1944 the outstanding shares of the Owen Sound Transportation Company Limited were acquired by Dominion Transportation Company.

Ivor Wagner had managed both firms since 1937, although absent from the area while he served overseas in the Canadian Army during World War II. He returned to Owen Sound in January 1945 to resume his responsibility as president and general manager of both companies. Other directors included W.W. Barnard of Owen Sound, employed by OSTC since 1927, who served as vice president and manager of operations. Mr. W.W. Barnard became president of the company at the beginning of 1969; W.A. Alexander, secretary-treasurer, who had been with Dominion Transportation Company since 1924; and William Owens, chief engineer, who had a lengthy connection with both firms, beginning with his association with the S.S. Manitou when the ship was constructed in 1903. Mr. Owens had been chief engineer of OSTC since 1926. The two concerns remained separate entities until the last DTC vessel, the S.S. Caribou, was sold at the end of the 1946 season.

In September 1946 a new ship, the S.S. Norisle—the name being derived from "North (Manitoulin) Island"—was put in service on the ferry route. Designed and built by the Collingwood Shipyards Limited for OSTC, the Norisle had a capacity of up to 50 automobiles and 250 passengers. Having more than twice the capacity of the S.S. Caribou and M.S. Normac combined, it was expected this new ship could handle the Tobermory - South Baymouth auto ferry route alone; however, because of an unanticipated increase in the volume of car traffic after the war, the Normac continued in service with the Norisle. Like her predecessors the Norisle was also equipped with staterooms for the accommodation of up to 100 passengers, enabling her to be used also on the Owen Sound - Sault Ste. Marie route during early and late navigation seasons.

The S.S. Manitoulin continued to navigate the Turkey Trail of the North Channel from Owen Sound until its honorable and well-deserved retirement in 1949. "Turkey Trail" was by then the affectionate term for the North Channel route, some say because a large number of turkeys were transported from Manitoulin's island ports along the north shore during the years immediately following World War II, and others because the ships serving the isolated ports of the North Channel wandered across the channel like turkeys. In 1950, the 60-year-old S.S. Manitoulin was replaced by the S.S. Norgoma—the name being derived from "North (District of) Algoma"—again designed and built by the Collingwood Shipyards Limited. Unlike the Norisle, the S.S. Norgoma was designed primarily as a package freighter and passenger steamship, specifically for the Georgian Bay and North Channel route—but, reflecting the practicality of its Grey County ownership, like its predecessors the Norgoma could also transport cars (if only a limited number of them).

The Norgoma operated on five-day (Owen Sound to Sault Ste Marie) and weekend (Owen Sound to Gore Bay) cruises, which remained very popular throughout the 1950s. However, the OSTC depended on its package freight trade to balance its books. By the early 1960s, that trade had largely dried up; the formerly isolated ports along the Turkey Trail were now served by roads and trucks. For some years, largely in order that their historic service could continue to the delight of tourists and Manitoulin Island communities and their leaders, OSTC was heavily subsidised by the Federal and Provincial governments.

The volume of car and passenger traffic on the Tobermory-South Baymouth run, however, continued to expand year by year. In 1962, Collingwood Shipyards converted the S.S. Norgoma to diesel-power, thus she became M.S. Norgoma, and in 1963 she began renewed life as a car and passenger ferry, sister-in-trade to the S.S. Norisle—and occasionally, at the beginning, to the old M.S. Normac.

Traffic continued to mount on the ferry run. The Government of Ontario, through its Crown corporation, the Ontario Northland Transportation Commission, acquired the Owen Sound Transportation Company in 1974.  This development resulted in the S.S. Norisle and M.S. Norgoma joining M.S. Normac in retirement; and a new vessel being commissioned.  The M.S. Chi-Cheemaun—translating to "Big Canoe" in Ojibwe—was the largest vessel to ever operate on the route.  At the time of her commissioning, she was one of Canada's newest state-of-the-art ferries, having been designed by British Columbia naval architects and built on Georgian Bay by the ever-reliable local Collingwood Shipyards as one of their last "hulls".  Her service continues the story of that of her distinguished and well-loved predecessor ships. OSTC was spun off from ONTC in 2002.

Ships of Owen Sound Transportation Company Limited

References

External links
 Owen Sound Transportation Company

 
Ferry companies of Ontario
Companies based in Ontario
Transport in Manitoulin District
Defunct shipping companies of Canada